Toyota Motor Corporation's R family is a family of 5-speed RWD/4WD transmissions built by Aisin. They share much in common (such as the bell housing-to-body bolt patterns) with the Aisin AR transmission (rebadged MA-5 by GM,  AX-15 by Jeep, and Isuzu AR5)

R150
A 2WD transmission found in Toyota Tacoma/Hilux 1996+, Toyota Prado . It came with two input shaft lengths pre- 1996 and 1996 and up (20mm longer)

Ratios:
 First Gear: 3.830:1
 Second Gear: 2.062:1
 Third Gear: 1.436:1
 Fourth Gear: 1.00:1
 Fifth Gear: 0.838:1
 Reverse Gear 4.22:1

R150F
A 4WD manual transmission found in many Toyota trucks. Land Cruiser II, Land Cruiser Prado Toyota 4runner and Hilux Surf (1989-1995) 2L-T series and 1KZ series Turbo Diesel, V6 3VZE and 5VZ-FE (also Japan, UK and Europe 1KZ/TE 4Runner 89–95)

T100:
1995-1998 5VZ-FE 4WD 5MT Transfer case - VF1A

Tacoma/Hilux:
1988–1995.5 3VZ-E 4WD 
1995.5-2004 5VZ-FE 4WD N160/N170/N190

4Runner/Hilux Surf:
1988–1995.5 3VZ-E 4WD 
1995.5-2000 5VZ-FE 4WD N180

Ratios:
 First Gear: 3.830:1
 Second Gear: 2.062:1
 Third Gear: 1.436:1
 Fourth Gear: 1.00:1
 Fifth Gear: 0.838:1
 Reverse Gear 4.220:1

R151F
A 4WD transmission used in a wide range of Toyota 4x4s

Land Cruiser:
1986-1990 2LTE J70-J73
1990-2002 1HZ J70-J79
1998-2002 1HZ J100/J105

Hilux/Pickup/Tacoma:
1986/1987 22-RTE N90-N120
1997-2005 1KZTE N140-N170
2006-2015 1KD-FTV N15-N26

4Runner/Surf/Prado:
1990-1993 2LTE N130 4runner/Surf
1994-1995 1KZTE N130 4runner/Surf
1996-2002 1KZTE N180 Surf/J90 Prado
2002-2005 1KZTE N210 Surf/J120 Prado
2006-2009 1KDFTV N210 Surf/J120 Prado
2009-2015 1KDFTV J150 Prado

Ratios:
 First Gear: 4.315:1
 Second Gear: 2.330:1
 Third Gear: 1.436:1
 Fourth Gear: 1.00:1
 Fifth Gear: 0.838:1
 Reverse Gear 4.220:1

R154 
1987-2004

This is a 5-speed transmission found in the MKIII Supra Turbo, Toyota Crown, Toyota Chaser Tourer V, Toyota Mark II Tourer V, Toyota Cresta Tourer V, and Toyota Soarer (turbo).

There are 2 different shifter housing styles-
 Sealed shifter (found on the MkIII Supra Turbo R154)
 Tripod linkage style (Commonly found on the Jzx90/100/110 Tourer-V platforms for reference)  

Note: The US only received the R154 in the 1987-1992 Toyota Supra MA70 (7M-GTE) and is a sealed shifter style, all other examples were designated for other markets. 

Ratios:
 First Gear: 3.251:1
 Second Gear: 1.955:1
 Third Gear: 1.310:1
 Fourth Gear: 1.00:1
 Fifth Gear: 0.753:1

R155
A 2WD transmission found in the 2005-2015 Toyota Tacoma.

 First Gear: 3.95:1
 Second Gear: 2.06:1
 Third Gear: 1.44:1
 Fourth Gear: 1.00:1
 Fifth Gear: 0.81:1
 Reverse Gear: 4.22:1

R155F
A 4WD transmission found in the 2005-2015 Toyota Tacoma.

 First Gear: 3.95:1
 Second Gear: 2.06:1
 Third Gear: 1.44:1
 Fourth Gear: 1.00:1
 Fifth Gear: 0.81:1
 Reverse Gear: 4.22:1

R156
A RWD transmission.

A variant exists for the Chilean market named "R156, CHILE SPEC (EURO 5 REGULATION)" found in the 2012-2015 (commercial years) Toyota Hilux with 2KDFTV engine.

 First Gear: 4.31:1
 Second Gear: 2.33:1
 Third Gear: 1.44:1
 Fourth Gear: 1.00:1
 Fifth Gear: 0.79:1
 Reverse Gear: 4.22:1

R156F
A 4WD transmission found in the 2016-2017 Toyota Tacoma, an upgraded version of the R155F with triple-cone synchronizer added to first gear.

 First Gear: 4.31:1
 Second Gear: 2.33:1
 Third Gear: 1.44:1
 Fourth Gear: 1.00:1
 Fifth Gear: 0.79:1
 Reverse Gear: 4.22:1

R350
A 2WD transmission found in the 100 Series Turbo Diesel Toyota Hiace Super Custom. It has side mounted shifting levers for connection to linkages or cables.

R351
A 2WD transmission found in the 200 Series Toyota Hiace both Petrol (TRH2XX) and Diesel (KDH2XX).  This variant has a triple cone synchromesh on first and second gears.  It has side mounted shifting levers for connection to linkages or cables.

 First Gear: 4.313:1
 Second Gear: 2.330:1
 Third Gear: 1.436:1
 Fourth Gear: 1.000:1
 Fifth Gear: 0.838:1
 Reverse Gear: 4.220:1

R452
A 2WD 5 speed transmission found in most light duty Toyota Dyna trucks, this transmission has a drum brake on the rear and steel housings.
These transmissions can be used to give a significantly lower first, and a slightly higher overdrive (5th) when fitted to an R151 4WD gearbox.

 First Gear: 5.147:1
 Second Gear: 2.74:1
 Third Gear: 1.93:1
 Fourth Gear: 1.00:1
 Fifth Gear: 0.8305:1
 Reverse Gear: 5.04:1

See also
 List of Toyota transmissions

References

External links
 Toyota Transmissions

R